Amélie Jakobovits, Baroness Jakobovits (née Munk; 31 May 1928 – 7 May 2010) was a British charity patron, and the wife of Immanuel Jakobovits, Chief Rabbi of the United Hebrew Congregations of the Commonwealth, and an important figure in Jewish life in the UK in her own right, who was known as the "Queen Mother" of the UK's Jewish community.

Early life
She was born Amélie Munk on 31 May 1928 in Ansbach, Bavaria, Germany, the daughter of Elie Munk (1900–1981), a rabbi and rabbinic scholar, and his wife, Fanny Frumet Munk, née Goldberger (1906–1979). In 1936, they moved to Paris, and after the Nazi invasion, moved to Switzerland in 1940, and remained there until Paris was liberated.

Career
Unusually in Orthodox Jewish life, she mediated between her husband and Menachem Mendel Schneerson, who was the Lubavitcher Rebbe, leader of one of the largest Hassidic groups, on matters relating to Israel. Her husband was far more of a "dove", and Schneerson was quite "hawkish". This was made possible by a longstanding connection between them - she had even played football as a child with Schneerson in pre-war France.

She led the first marches in support of the Soviet Jewry movement, supporting Jews being allowed to leave the Eastern Bloc for resettling in Israel.

She did extensive charity work, including Yad Sarah, Emunah and Kisharon. After her husband died, she became known as the "Queen Mother" of the UK's Jewish community.

Personal life
She met her future husband Immanuel Jakobovits through a family friend, and Jakobovits proposed to her at the top of the Eiffel Tower. They had two sons and four daughters.

She was a cousin of the American writer on the Holocaust Deborah Lipstadt.

Later life
She died at the Royal Free Hospital, London, of bronchopneumonia and heart failure, on 7 May 2010. Her death was mourned by a crowd of 5,000 on the Shirehall Estate in Hendon, London, where she had lived in her later years. She was buried next to her husband on the Mount of Olives, Israel.

References

1928 births
2010 deaths
Burials at the Jewish cemetery on the Mount of Olives
Jewish emigrants from Nazi Germany to the United Kingdom
Naturalised citizens of the United Kingdom
German emigrants to the United Kingdom
People from Ansbach
German expatriates in England
British baronesses
Spouses of life peers
Wives of knights